Kensington is a residential suburb 3 km from Perth's central business district. Kensington is located within the City of South Perth and Town of Victoria Park local government areas.

The suburb is bounded by Canning Highway to the west, Berwick Street to the north, Kent Street to the east, and Hayman Road and South Terrace to the south.

The suburb was named after the Kensington Park racecourse which, in turn, was most likely named after the prestigious London suburb of Kensington.

Senior and tertiary education 
Kensington contains Kensington Primary School.

References 

 
Suburbs of Perth, Western Australia